The Institution of Lighting Professionals (ILP) is a United Kingdom and Ireland professional engineering institution founded in 1924 as the Association of Public Lighting Engineers, later known as the Institution of Lighting Engineers, and taking its present name in 2010. It is licensed by the Engineering Council to assess candidates for inclusion on its Register of professional Engineers. The Institute's address is Regent House, Regent Place, Rugby, Warwickshire, CV21 2PN.

It has about 2000 individual members, and 120 company or organization members.  The President is Alan Jaques and the Chief Executive is Richard Frost.  It is registered in the UK as a private company limited by guarantee without share capital (number 00227499).  Its principal object is "To act as a learned Society for engineers in the lighting and allied industries and as a technical and educative body for the public dissemination of technical information and the laying down of standards of qualification."

References

External links
 

Architectural lighting design
ECUK Licensed Members
Engineering societies based in the United Kingdom